Charing Cross (Glasgow) is a railway station close to the centre of Glasgow, Scotland, serving the district of the same name. It is managed by ScotRail and is served by trains on the North Clyde Line.

History 
Dating from 1886, it was originally part of the Glasgow City and District Railway, the first underground railway in Scotland. The station was built using the cut and cover method, with the original walls being visible on the open air section at the western end of the platforms. Nearby points of interest include Sauchiehall Street and the Mitchell Library, and the station (along with nearby Anderston - a stop on the Argyle Line), serves the city's financial district, making this station popular with commuters.

The original surface buildings of the station were removed in the late 1960s during the construction of the M8 motorway, and replaced by the current structure as part of the adjoining Elmbank Gardens commercial development in 1970 - the building was designed by the Richard Seifert Co-Partnership. In 1995 it received a minor refurbishment when lifts were provided down to platform level. The present station contains a staffed ticket office.

Automatic ticket gates have now been installed and came into operation on 3 June 2011.

Services
The service pattern, Mondays-Saturdays Daytime, is as following:

 2tph Edinburgh to Milngavie
 2tph Edinburgh to Helensburgh Central, semi-fast
 2tph Airdrie to Balloch via Singer
 2tph Cumbernauld to Dumbarton Central via Yoker
 2tph Milngavie to Edinburgh, express
 2tph Dumbarton Central to Cumbernauld
 2tph Balloch to Airdrie
 2tph Helensburgh Central to Edinburgh Waverley

Sunday service is:

 2tph Edinburgh to Helensburgh Central
 1tph Cumbernauld to Partick
 2tph Helensburgh Central to Edinburgh
 1tph Partick to Cumbernauld

References

Bibliography
 
 

Railway stations in Glasgow
Former North British Railway stations
Railway stations in Great Britain opened in 1886
SPT railway stations
Railway stations served by ScotRail
Railway stations located underground in the United Kingdom